Simon Meredith House is a historic home located in South Coventry Township, Chester County, Pennsylvania.  It was built in two major phases.  The oldest section was built in the early 18th century. It is a -story, two-bay, stuccoed fieldstone structure with a gable roof.  The larger Federal-style addition was made on the east end.  It is  stories, four bays wide, and of stucco-over-stone construction.  The house features a full-width, one-story porch.

The house was added to the National Register of Historic Places in 1974.

References

Houses on the National Register of Historic Places in Pennsylvania
Federal architecture in Pennsylvania
Houses completed in 1720
Houses in Chester County, Pennsylvania
National Register of Historic Places in Chester County, Pennsylvania
1720 establishments in Pennsylvania